Adaina microdactyla is a moth of the family Pterophoridae first described by Jacob Hübner in 1813. Also known as the hemp-agrimony plume, it is found in Africa, Asia and Europe.

The wingspan is 13–17 mm. The forewings are whitish yellowish, sprinkled with blackish. The hindwings are grey. The flesh-colour larva has a slightly paler dorsal line and numerous rough points on the dorsum. The head is pale yellowish-brown.

Adults are on wing in May and June and again in August in two generations in western Europe.

The larvae feed on hemp-agrimony (Eupatorium cannabinum), Indian camphorweed (Pluchea indica), European goldenrod (Solidago virgaurea) and Brassica species. There are two broods, one which bores in stems and produces galls, the other feeding in flowers, although flower feeding has not been recently confirmed.

Distribution
It has a wide distribution and is known from the Palearctic realm (from Europe to Korea, Japan and China), Asia Minor, Iran, Vietnam, the Solomon Islands, the Philippines, Sri Lanka, Indonesia and Papua New Guinea. It is also found in Africa, including the Democratic Republic of the Congo and Madagascar.

References

External links
Taxonomic And Biological Studies Of Pterophoridae Of Japan (Lepidoptera)
Japanese Moths
 Plant Parasites of Europe

Oidaematophorini
Moths described in 1813
Plume moths of Africa
Plume moths of Asia
Plume moths of Europe
Taxa named by Jacob Hübner